The Farak Formation is a geological formation in Niger, central Africa.

Its strata date back to the Early Cenomanian. Dinosaur remains are among the fossils that have been recovered from the formation.

Vertebrate paleofauna 
 Bahariasaurus ingens 
 Rebbachisaurus tamesnensis 
 Aegyptosaurus baharijensis
 Spinosaurus?
 Fortignathus felixi

See also 
 List of dinosaur-bearing rock formations
 List of fossiliferous stratigraphic units in Niger

References

Bibliography 
 

Geologic formations of Niger
Upper Cretaceous Series of Africa
Cretaceous Niger
Cenomanian Stage